Naduvazhikal is a 1989 Indian Malayalam-language action crime film directed by Joshiy and written by S. N. Swami. The film was loosely based on The Godfather. It tells the story of Arjun (Mohanlal), who takes up the business empire of his father Ananthan (Madhu), who has been sent to jail, and his clashes with his father's rivals, the Chekkudi brothers. The film also features Murali, Devan, Thilakan, Kuthiravattom Pappu, Jagathy Sreekumar and Manianpilla Raju in supporting roles. The music was composed by Shyam. The film was released on 5 May 1989 to positive reviews and was one of the highest-grossing films of the year. The climax of the film was highly appreciated by critics and audience like.

Plot 

Arjun is enjoying his student life in Bangalore city with his friends and his girlfriend Rosemary. Back home his father Ananthan is an affluent businessman with a shady past. Ananthan is constantly being targeted by Mathukutty and Cherian (Chekkudi Brothers), who are supported by Abraham Varkey.

Ananthan is arrested one day and sent to prison. Arjun is forced to come from Bangalore to release his father. But his first attempt fails. Chekkudi Brothers, with the help of new Home minister Gopalan Pillai and CI Bharathan tries to catch Arjun and include him in many cases. But he overcomes everything. At last Arjun releases his father, but Chekkudi kills Ananthan and Arjun finishes both of them.

Cast

 Mohanlal as Arjun
 Madhu as Ananthan
 Thilakan as Shankaran
 Janardhanan as Aasan
 Rupini as Rosemary
 Sithara as Rema
 Kuthiravattam Pappu as K.C.
 Maniyanpilla Raju as Ravi
 Vijayaraghavan as DSP Sandeep Varma
 Devan as Mathukutty (Chekudi Senior)
 Murali as Cherian (Chekudi Junior)
 Prathapachandran as Panicker
 Jagathy Sreekumar as Bawa
 Babu Namboothiri as Abraham Varkey
 Jagannatha Varma as DYSP Pavithran
 KPAC Azeez as CI Bharathan
 K. P. A. C. Sunny as Koshy
 Kollam Thulasi as Home Minister Gopala Pillai
Vijayan as Stephen, Rosemary's Uncle
 Kunchan as Antony
 Ravi Menon as Shekharan
 M.S. Thripunithura as MLA Sathyanathan
 Valsala Menon as Dr. Catherine
 Santhadevi as Koshy's Mother

Trivia

 Simhasanam with Prithviraj Sukumaran was initially planned as the remake of Naduvazhikal, but on scripting, it deviated so much from the original story that, it was no longer a rehashed version of the 1989 hit. So the makers of Simhasanam made it as a loosely based adaptation of Mario Puzo's The Godfather.
 The film was the last collaboration between S. N. Swamy and Mohanlal until the release of Lokpal in 2013.

References

External links

1989 films
1980s Malayalam-language films
Indian crime action films
Indian family films
Films about corruption in India
Fictional portrayals of the Kerala Police
Films shot in Kannur
Films shot in Bangalore
Films directed by Joshiy